Galaxy Airways was a Greek charter airline based in Athens that existed from 1999 to 2001. It had a fleet of 3 aircraft, one Boeing 737-500 and two Boeing 737-400.

History

1999
Company foundation year.  Was founded by Capt. Theodore Kokmotos.
Initial scheduled flights operation began immediately with a Boeing 737-500, between Thessaloniki and the three German cities, Düsseldorf, Stuttgart and Munich.  The budget, as well as the assets of the company, was profitable.

2000
Galaxy Airways expands its fleet with two more Boeing 737s, (in total the fleet consists of 3 aircraft). Its flight network expands as well, between two smaller cities of Greece, Kavala and Preveza and four German cities Nuremberg, Berlin, Stuttgart, Düsseldorf.  These cities were connecting for the first time with scheduled flights.

2001
New shareholders came in the company and the founder walked out from the company's management. Since then management was performed by the new shareholders. Galaxy Airways under its new management ends its scheduled flights and turns to charter flights only, targeting into an even more profitability.  Company continued for two more years until the main stockholders decided to end their involvement with the airline business.

References

Defunct airlines of Greece
1999 establishments in Greece
2001 disestablishments in Greece
Greek companies established in 1999
Airlines established in 1999
Airlines disestablished in 2001